Rob Morris may refer to:
 Rob Morris (American football) (born 1975), American former National Football League player
 Rob Morris (Freemason) (1818–1888), American poet and Freemason

See also
Robert Morris (disambiguation)